Wounded Warrior Project (WWP) is an American charity and veterans service organization that operates as a nonprofit 501(c)(3). WWP offers a variety of programs, services and events for wounded veterans who incurred a physical or mental injury, illnesses, or co-incident to their military service on or after September 11, 2001. Military family members and caregivers are also eligible for WWP programs.

As of August 22, 2021, WWP served 157,975 registered alumni and 40,520 registered family support members. Since its formation, the organization has partnered with several charities they deem community partners, including the American Red Cross, Resounding Joy, a music therapy group in California, and Operation Homefront. In July 2022, WWP partnered with a total of twenty-eight veteran service organizations who collectively received grants  totalling over $5.9 million. WWP has also previously provided a year-long Track program, which helped veterans transition to college and the workplace.

WWP allocates 71 percent of its revenue to programs and services for wounded veterans and their families, and the remaining balance pays to support those programs.

WWP is recognized under the Combined Federal Campaign (CFC) workplace giving program of the federal government of the United States with CFC #11425.

History
Wounded Warrior Project was founded in 2003 in Roanoke, Virginia, by John Melia. Melia had been severely wounded in a helicopter crash while serving in Somalia in 1992. Melia assembled backpacks distributed to injured veterans at the former Bethesda Naval Hospital (now the Walter Reed National Military Medical Center) and Walter Reed Army Medical Center.

Wounded Warrior Project initially operated as a division of the United Spinal Association of New York, which adopted WWP as a program in November 2003. WWP continued to support injured service members by providing them with free WWP Backpacks filled with comfort items.

In September 2005, The United Spinal Association granted $2.7 million to WWP to "develop into a stand-alone charity with its own identity and programs," with the intent to expand its services from providing immediate comfort items to providing longer-term support for returning wounded veterans via compensation, education, health care, insurance, housing, employment, etc.

The WWP Backpacks program remains a central activity of WWP, evidenced by the more than 65,000 backpacks the organization has distributed since 2018 in support of transitioning U.S. military veterans.

Former CEO Steven Nardizzi and former COO Al Giordano were fired from Wounded Warrior Project after they were accused in 2016 of spending massive amounts of the nonprofit's money on lavish company retreats and personal enrichment for themselves. Several former employees alleged that they were fired because they raised concerns over the mismanagement.

Incorporation
Wounded Warrior Project registered for incorporation on February 23, 2005. WWP was granted accreditation as of September 10, 2008, by the Veterans Affairs Secretary as a Veterans Service Organization (VSO) "recognized by the Secretary for the purpose of preparation, presentation, and prosecution of claims under laws administered by the Department of Veterans Affairs." The Veterans Administration's online List of Representatives for Accredited Organizations includes contact information for WWP's accredited service officers. as well as a search tool to access information about other VSOs.

In July 2006, Wounded Warrior Project's headquarters were moved to Jacksonville, Florida. WWP Founder John Melia cited a strong local veteran community, access to Jacksonville International Airport, and support from the local business community, specifically the PGA Tour, as the reason for the move. The WWP headquarters underwent a major $1.3 million renovation according to the Jacksonville Business Journal.

Veterans and military support programs

Mental wellness 
Wounded Warrior Project provides interactive programs, rehabilitation retreats, and free mental health counseling. WWP's outpatient care and therapy sessions provide PTSD and TBI treatment through four academic medical centers in the United States, including Emory Healthcare Veterans Program.

Warriors to Work 
Warriors to Work is a WWP veteran employment program that connects veterans with employers and resources for jobs. Through career counseling, including resume building, interview preparation, and salary negotiation assistance, veterans can find work that best fits their skill sets and allows them to smoothly transition into civilian life.

Family support programs 
Wounded Warrior Project helps families of veterans reconnect through events that support family bonding and transitional skills. By providing the space and time for veterans to spend with their loved ones, the transition from service member to civilian gets that much easier. Through their veteran family support programs, Wounded Warrior Project also helps guide families through the sometimes confusing process of receiving VA benefits.

Warrior Care Network 
Warrior Care Network is an initiative providing access to high-quality care for veterans mainly dealing with post-traumatic stress disorder (PTSD) and traumatic brain injury (TBI). Established in 2016, the $100 million project included four PTSD treatment centers in Atlanta, Boston, Los Angeles, and Chicago.

Project Odyssey 
Project Odyssey is an "adventure-based learning program" that provides veterans from all branches of the armed services an opportunity to work together in group activities and psychoeducational sessions. Through the Project Odyssey program, veterans can engage with other veterans with similar interests, such as motorcycle riding. Rolling Project Odyssey offers a series of group rides for veterans.

Soldier Ride 
For the past 20 years, Wounded Warrior Project has organized its annual Soldier Ride, a multi-day cycling program. The most recent Soldier Ride was in January 2023 and featured a 3-day bike ride starting in Miami, Florida, and ending in the Florida Keys. Participants in the ride were also invited to interact with dolphins at Dolphin Research Center in the Florida Keys. In 2022, participants were invited to the White House to start the ride, where they were welcomed by President Joe Biden and First Lady Jill Biden.

Independence Program 
Wounded Warrior Project's Independence Program offers support to veterans with brain injuries, spinal cord injuries, or other neurological conditions, and their caregivers. This program is for recovering veterans that are transitioning from a medical facility to their home environment to allow them to rely on themselves and become functionally independent. Through the program, veterans gain access to occupational therapy, social workers and rehab counselors on site where they live, without having to pay any out of pocket costs.

Controversy 
On May 27, 2014, Wounded Warrior Project filed a lawsuit against Dean Graham, a disabled veteran with PTSD, and his Help Indiana Vets, Inc. organization. After a court ruling, Graham retracted the allegations he leveled against Wounded Warrior Project and folded his direct-aid non-profit. In 2016 and 2017, however, subsequent investigations by a Jacksonville, FL television station and the U.S. Senate Judiciary Committee found that WWP "'inaccurately' reported the money it spent on veterans' programs by using 'inflated' numbers and 'misleading' advertisements."

Wounded Warrior Project filed a lawsuit in October 2014 seeking damages and court costs against a Blandon, Pennsylvania, non-profit, Keystone Wounded Warriors, claiming confusing similarities between the Keystone and WWP logo; Hampton Roads, VA Channel 3 TV covered the Keystone story on April 30, 2015, and Nonprofit Quarterly covered the story with a title asking, is WWP "a 'Neighborhood Bully' among Veterans Groups?" Tim Mak also covered the suit for the Daily Beast.

After a reporter for the Tacoma, Washington News Tribune informed disabled veteran Airman Alex Graham, a blogger at the conspiracy website Veterans Today, of a pending lawsuit against him by the WWP, he removed his articles critical of their policies, later retracting his criticisms and issuing a public apology.

Title 38 
In March 2014, WWP testified before Congress strongly supporting the bill "To amend title 38, United States Code, to provide veterans with counseling and treatment for sexual trauma that occurred during inactive duty training (H.R. 2527; 113th Congress)". The bill would extend a VA program of counseling, care and services for military sexual trauma that occurred during active duty or active duty for training to veterans who experienced such trauma during inactive duty training. The bill would alter current law, which allows access to such counseling only to active duty members of the military, so that members of the Reserves and National Guard would be eligible.

The WWP did a study of its alumni and found that, "almost half of the respondents indicated accessing care through VA for MST-related conditions was 'very difficult'. And of those who did not seek VA care, 41% did not know they were eligible for such care." The WWP also testified that in addition to expanding access to MST care, the VA needed to improve care itself, because veterans report "inadequate screening, providers who were either insensitive or lacked needed expertise and facilities ill-equipped to appropriately care for MST survivors."

Government affairs 
The Government Affairs team advocates for legislation that helps veterans and their supporters. Several bills have passed, including the Traumatic Injury Protection Program (TSGLI), the Caregivers and Veterans Omnibus Health Services Act of 2010, the Ryan Kules and Paul Benne Specially Adaptive Housing Improvement Act of 2019, the Veteran Families Financial Support Act (2020) and the PACT Act (2022). WWP's legislative agenda is guided by the information in the organization's Annual Warrior Alumni Survey and encompasses issue areas spanning from veteran brain health and toxic exposure to women veteran issues.

In 2020, Wounded Warrior Project's Legislative Director, Derek Fronabarger, worked with Jon Stewart from The Daily Show to advocate on Toxic Exposure related issues for service members and veterans.

In 2022, Jose Ramos, vice president of government and community relations for the Wounded Warrior Project announced support, on behalf of WWP, for the Maj. Richard Star amendment, a House Bill that would make disabled war veterans with under 20 years of active service eligible for both disability and retirement benefits.

Donations and spending 
In 2012, WWP spent US$114,817,090 on programs in support of wounded veterans, their families, and caregivers.

In 2013, a new employee mistakenly declined to accept a donation from Liberty Baptist Church in Fort Pierce, Florida, and issued this inadvertent statement to the church leaders in an email, "We must decline the opportunity to be the beneficiary of your event due to our fundraising event criteria, which doesn't allow community events to be religious in nature." Shortly after the church received this letter, a WWP spokesperson apologized and said that it was a miscommunication.

In June 2015, The Daily Beast reported that the WWP sells its donor information to third parties. It also alleged that WWP distributed what it deemed an insubstantial percentage of donations to actual wounded warriors, and that it overpaid its executive staff.

In January 2016, The New York Times reported that only 60 percent of the revenue of the Wounded Warrior Project is spent on programs to help veterans; the remaining 40 percent was overhead. It also reported claims of work environment coercion, and multiple terminations. That same month, CBS News disclosed that the WWP had grown to spend millions of dollars annually on team-building events.

In March 2016, Wounded Warrior Project's board of directors dismissed the charity's top two executives, Steven Nardizzi and Al Giordano, after hiring the law firm Simpson Thacher & Bartlett to perform an independent review of spending issues related to the company's funds. Board chairman Anthony Odierno was announced as temporarily taking control of the charity. And spending on conferences and meetings had increased from just under $2 million in 2010 to $26 million in 2014.

In October 2016, Charity Navigator dropped Wounded Warrior Project from its "watch list", and later boosted the nonprofit's score to a four-star rating (out of four stars).

In February 2017, the Better Business Bureau released a report clearing Wounded Warrior Project of the "lavish spending" allegations, and "found the organization's spending to be consistent with its programs and mission."

Charity ratings 
According to a 2013 article in Nonprofit Quarterly, "Depending on the rater, the Wounded Warrior Project seems to have scored low (Charity Watch), high (BBB Wise Giving Alliance) or somewhere in the middle (Charity Navigator)". However, for the fiscal year ended 30 September 2016, Charity Watch assigned WWP a C+ rating (up from a D originally) and Charity Navigator published its rating for WWP on 1 February 2017 as "four out of four stars" (up from three). As of August 2018, that rating had dropped back down to 3 stars. According to Charity Navigator, WWP allocates 71 percent of its revenue to program and service expenses and the remaining balance pays to support those programs. In January 2017 The Better Business Bureau's Wise Giving Alliance renewed its accreditation of WWP, for the next two years, as meeting the 20 standards for charity accountability.

See also
 Warrior Games (multi-sport event)
 Warrior Care Network
 Help for Heroes

References

External links
 
 Wounded Warrior Project coverage at C-SPAN

2003 establishments in Florida
501(c)(3) organizations
Advocacy groups in the United States
Charities based in Florida
Non-profit organizations based in Jacksonville, Florida
Organizations established in 2003
United States military support organizations
Wounded and disabled military veterans topics